In addition to Pope Francis, who served as president of the Third Extraordinary General Assembly of the Synod of Bishops, which met on 5–19 October 2014, there were 15 other classes of participants. Cardinal Lorenzo Baldisseri served as Secretary General, Cardinal Péter Erdő was the Relator General, and Archbishop Bruno Forte was the Special Secretary. The delegate presidents Cardinals André Vingt-Trois, Luis Antonio G. Tagle, and Raymundo Damasceno Assis. The Commission for the Message had Cardinal Gianfranco Ravasi as president and Archbishop Víctor Manuel Fernández as secretary. Bishop Fabio Fabene, undersecretary of the Synod of Bishops, also participated.

Eastern Catholic Churches
The Eastern Catholic Churches were represented by

Representatives of episcopal conferences

The Synod statues provided for the heads of 114 episcopal conferences to participate as voting delegates.

Africa

The Americas

Asia

Europe

Oceania

Superiors General
Three delegates from the leadership of the Union of Superiors General were added to represent those in religious life.

Heads of the Dicasteries of the Roman Curia
The 25 heads of the Dicasteries of the Roman Curia served as delegates as provided for in the Synod statutes.

Members of the Ordinary Council
The 15 members of the Ordinary Council of the Synod also attended:

Papal appointees
There were 26 additional members appointed by Pope Francis.

Other participants

Collaborators of the Special Secretary
The following were appointed to be collaborators of the Special Secretary:

Auditors
The auditors included 14 married couples named by Pope Francis.

Fraternal delegates

References

Synod of bishops in the Catholic Church
Lists of Roman Catholic bishops and archbishops
2014 in Vatican City